Ganspan is a town in Frances Baard District Municipality in the Northern Cape province of South Africa.

References

Populated places in the Phokwane Local Municipality